Rilo Kiley was an American indie rock band  based in Los Angeles, California. Formed in 1998, the band consisted of Jenny Lewis, Blake Sennett, Pierre de Reeder, and Dave Rock.

The group released their debut album Take-Offs and Landings under Seattle-based independent label Barsuk Records in 2001.  After that, they released three additional studio albums and several EPs. In 2007, they were signed with Warner Bros., and subsequently made their major-label debut with the album Under the Blacklight.

History
Rilo Kiley performed their first concert at Spaceland in Los Angeles in January 1998. Their debut EP, Rilo Kiley (later reissued as The Initial Friend EP), was released in 1999. The band signed with independent label Barsuk Records for its first full-length album, Take-Offs and Landings, in 2001. The band later signed with Omaha's Saddle Creek Records and released The Execution of All Things in 2002. In 2004, it released More Adventurous on its own imprint, Brute/Beaute Records, which was distributed by major label Warner Bros. Records. The band later signed directly with Warner Bros.

2004 saw a great increase in recognition for the band, as Sennett and Boesel released an album with their band The Elected and Lewis sang backup on The Postal Service's Give Up. Lewis toured with The Postal Service before heading out on two tours in support of Rilo Kiley's More Adventurous in the summer and fall of 2004. The album spent late 2004 high on Billboard'''s Heatseekers Chart, and was promoted with appearances on Late Night with Conan O'Brien and Jimmy Kimmel Live!. The band opened for Bright Eyes on the international leg of Conor Oberst's tour for 2005's I'm Wide Awake, It's Morning and was the opening act for the North American dates of Coldplay's Twisted Logic Tour in Fall 2005. "I Never" and "Ripchord" (from More Adventurous) have been featured in several feature films, including Must Love Dogs, Conversations with Other Women, and John Tucker Must Die.

The band's fourth album Under the Blacklight was released August 20, 2007 in the United Kingdom and the following day in the United States. Its first single is "The Moneymaker". For the video, the band cast "real-life porn stars", who Lewis says were told they were auditioning for "soft core porn". The second single is "Silver Lining".

On September 6, 2007, the band began a North American tour in support of Under the Blacklight. On this tour, it was joined by Orenda Fink (of Azure Ray) and Kristin Gundred (of Grand Ole Party and Dum Dum Girls).

The group was also known for its charitable contributions, particularly to the Elliott Smith Memorial Fund, in honor of the late singer and friend of the band. Sennett and Lewis participated in a memorial concert for the singer shortly after his death in 2003. In 2007, the band contributed a t-shirt, which was designed by de Reeder for the Yellow Bird Project to benefit the Elliott Smith Memorial Fund.

Hiatus and breakup
In a 2010 interview with Paste, Jason Boesel said the band was taking a break but working on a compilation of unreleased songs. He also said there were no plans to release a new album in the near future.

In an April 2011 interview, Blake Sennett said,"I would say that if Rilo Kiley were ... hmmm ... a human being ... hmmm ... he's probably laying on his back in a morgue with a tag on his toe. Now, I see movies where the dead get up and walk. And when they do that, rarely do good things happen."

In June 2011, when asked about his "corpse" comment and whether Rilo Kiley was indeed dead, Sennett said "I never say never. I loved Rilo Kiley—I loved writing with Jenny. I think she's a great artist and great to write with. I think we're not there yet. Maybe one day we'll dust it off and give it a go; I'd be open to it. I think it was fun—for all of the pitfalls, it was great. I had a great time in Rilo Kiley. I always did."

A month later Sennett told AOL Spinner: "I said, 'Fuck that, I can't do this anymore.' That being said, it was probably immature and that came from a place of ego. I think that stuff will rear its head in anything you do, depending on the personnel you surround yourself with; things change overtime  and people change and relationships change."

In February 2013, the band announced a collection of previously released rarities and unreleased material, titled Rkives, to be released in April 2013 on DeReeder's own label the Little Record Company.

In a 2014 interview with the National Post, Jenny Lewis confirmed the band had officially broken up.

In April 2015, Blake Sennett joined Jenny Lewis and her band on stage at Coachella for a performance of the Rilo Kiley song "Portions for Foxes".

Since embarking on a solo career, Jenny Lewis has enlisted the help of drummer Jason Boesel for percussion on studio recordings. He was also part of Lewis' live band for her 2019 tour.

Television appearances

The band's songs have frequently been used on television programs, such as The O.C. and Dawson's Creek. The apparent first use of Rilo Kiley music on a television show was also the last time that Blake Sennett and Jenny Lewis acted on television. In 2000, they played fictionalized versions of themselves (and the band performed "The Frug") on ABC's short-lived drama Once & Again. Both "The Frug" and "85" were used during a third season episode of Dawson's Creek (#46, "Barefoot At Capefest"). "Pictures of Success" was used in episode No. 114 of Buffy The Vampire Slayer, entitled "Older and Far Away". The song "Breakin' Up" was featured in a fourth season episode of  Grey's Anatomy. In 2005, "Portions For Foxes" was used in the pilot of Grey's Anatomy and in 2009, the song was used in the seventh episode of season one of Dollhouse, "Echoes". "With Arms Outstretched" was used at the end of the pilot episode of Weeds in 2005 and to bring the show full circle, it was the final song played in the series finale in 2012. For a second-season episode of Weeds, Lewis sang the theme song ("Little Boxes") with Johnathan Rice who was touring with the band. "Silver Lining" was featured in the pilot of Women's Murder Club. The song was also used in the second season of Girls. "The Moneymaker" was used on an episode of Nip/Tuck that aired on December 11, 2007 and on an episode of Samantha Who? that aired on April 16, 2009. "The Good That Won't Come Out" was featured in the background of the Season 4 Episode 4 episode of Heroes "Hysterical Blindness" on 10/12/2009. Their song "A Better Son/Daughter" was featured in the trailer for the Netflix original series Orange is the New Black. It is also featured at the end of Hannah Gadsby's 2018 Netflix special Nanette. Rilo Kiley's song "The Execution Of All Things" also featured in Episode 6, Season 4 of Six Feet Under. Their song "Go Ahead" was featured throughout the movie, Very Good Girls.

 Origin of the band's name 
On the syndicated radio show Loveline in August 2005, Sennett explained that he had a dream in which he was being chased by a sports almanac: "when it got me, I leafed through it...and I came upon an Australian rules football player from the 19th century named Rilo Kiley. It's kind of embarrassing." When asked by co-host Drew Pinsky if he had ever seen this name in reality, Sennett said "I don't think so, I don't think that character exists...If you Google 'Rilo Kiley' you just come back with a lot of pictures of us." On how this imaginary name became the name for the band: "I wrote it down on a blotter, an office desk when I woke up, and, I don't know, I came back to it when we were trying to think of a name and we thought we'd use that for one show then change it, 'cause who'd want that name? Who can remember that anyway?"

In 2005, Sennett told Planet Sound Teletext Magazine that the name came from a Scottish athlete. On a 2005 episode of the MSNBC entertainment show MSNBC Entertainment Hot List, the female host stated that the name came from "old Scottish sports almanacs". In the interview segment that followed, Sennett stated "We just looked in there and the name of one of the star players from the turn of the century was Rilo Kiley."

In an interview published in Q magazine in September 2007, Sennett stated that Rilo Kiley is named after a character he'd met in a dream who had predicted the date of Jenny Lewis' death.

Band members
 Jenny Lewis – vocals, keyboards, guitar, bass guitar (1998–2013)
 Blake Sennett – guitar, keyboards, vocals (1998–2013)
 Mike Bloom - pedal steel, guitars (2004–2005)
 Pierre de Reeder – bass guitar, guitar, backing vocals (1998–2013)
 Jason Boesel – drums, percussion (2001–2013)
 Dave Rock – drums, percussion (1998–2001)

Discography

 Take Offs and Landings (2001)
 The Execution of All Things (2002)
 More Adventurous (2004)
 Under the Blacklight'' (2007)

Videography
 "The Frug" (1999, directed by Morgan J. Freeman)
 "Wires and Waves" (2001 unreleased, 2007 released, directed by Morgan J. Freeman)
 "Bulletproof" (2001, directed by Liam Lynch)
 "Portions for Foxes" (2004, directed by Brian Lazzaro)
 "It's a Hit" (2005, directed by Andrew Bruntel, Matt Enlow)
 "The Moneymaker" (2007, directed by Autumn de Wilde)
 "Silver Lining" (2007, directed by Autumn de Wilde)
 "Let Me Back In" (2013, directed by Rilo Kiley)
 "Emotional" (2013, directed by Austin Nagler)

See also
 Jenny Lewis / Blake Sennett / Jason Boesel
 Bright Eyes
 The Postal Service
 The Elected
 Mike Bloom
 Jenny Lewis with the Watson Twins
 The Watson Twins
 Conor Oberst and the Mystic Valley Band
 Johnathan Rice
 Jenny and Johnny
 Night Terrors of 1927
 Nice as Fuck

References

External links

 Official site
 http://www.scenepointblank.com/news/splits/rilo-kiley-no-longer-on-hiatus-but-broken-up
 
 

Indie rock musical groups from California
Musical groups established in 1998
Musical groups disestablished in 2013
Barsuk Records artists
Saddle Creek Records artists
Musical groups from Los Angeles
Warner Records artists
1998 establishments in California